The 1981 NCAA Division I men's ice hockey tournament was the culmination of the 1980–81 NCAA Division I men's ice hockey season, the 34th such tournament in NCAA history. It was held between March 19 and 27, 1981, and concluded with Wisconsin defeating Minnesota 6-3. All Quarterfinals matchups were held at home team venues while all succeeding games were played at the Duluth Arena in Duluth, Minnesota.

1981 was the first year that the tournament guaranteed 8 teams to be selected for the championship as opposed the policy put in place in 1977 that gave the selection committee the ability to choose up to 4 additional teams at its discretion (two was the maximum the committee ever choose).

Qualifying teams
The NCAA permitted 8 teams to qualify for the tournament, four from each region (East and West). From the east the ECAC tournament champion and the regular season champions from the two ECAC divisions that did not contain the ECAC champion received automatic bids into the tournament with a fourth at-large bid going to one eastern team. From the west the two WCHA tournament co-champions and the CCHA tournament champion received automatic bids with a fourth at-large bid going to one western team.

Format
The tournament featured three rounds of play. The two odd-number ranked teams from one region were placed into a bracket with the two even-number ranked teams of the other region. The teams were then seeded according to their ranking. In the Quarterfinals the first and fourth seeds and the second and third seeds played two-game aggregate series to determine which school advanced to the Semifinals. Beginning with the Semifinals all games were played at the Duluth Arena and all series became Single-game eliminations. The winning teams in the semifinals advanced to the National Championship Game with the losers playing in a Third Place game.

Tournament bracket

Note: * denotes overtime period(s)

Quarterfinals

(E1) Clarkson vs. (W4) Wisconsin

(E2) Providence vs. (W3) Michigan Tech

(W1) Minnesota vs. (E4) Colgate

(W2) Northern Michigan vs. (E3) Cornell

Semifinal

(W1) Minnesota vs. (W3) Michigan Tech

(W2) Northern Michigan vs. (W4) Wisconsin

Third-place game

(W2) Northern Michigan vs. (W3) Michigan Tech

National Championship

(W1) Minnesota vs. (W4) Wisconsin

All-Tournament Team
G: Marc Behrend* (Wisconsin)
D: Mike Knoke (Minnesota)
D: Tim Watters (Michigan Tech)
F: Steve Bozek (Northern Michigan)
F: Aaron Broten (Minnesota)
F: John Newbery (Wisconsin)
* Most Outstanding Player(s)

References

Tournament
NCAA Division I men's ice hockey tournament
NCAA Division I Men's Ice Hockey Tournament
NCAA Division I Men's Ice Hockey Tournament
NCAA Division I Men's Ice Hockey Tournament
NCAA Division I Men's Ice Hockey Tournament
NCAA Division I Men's Ice Hockey Tournament
1980s in Minneapolis
Ice hockey competitions in Providence, Rhode Island
Ice hockey competitions in Minnesota
Ice hockey competitions in Michigan
Sports competitions in Duluth, Minnesota
Ice hockey competitions in Minneapolis
Ice hockey competitions in New York (state)
St. Lawrence County, New York
Marquette, Michigan